TrillStatik is a collaborative studio album by producer/DJ Statik Selektah and American rapper Bun B. The album features guest appearances from Method Man, Fat Joe, Smoke DZA, Westside Gunn, Uncle Murda, Big K.R.I.T., Talib Kweli and Paul Wall, among others. It was created entirely during an 11 hour livestream on YouTube, and was initially released exclusively through Tidal on April 20, 2019.

Background 

Bun B initially announced he and producer Statik Selektah would be creating an album from scratch on livestream through his Instagram on April 12, 2019. On April 19, the tracklist was revealed. The creation of the album was streamed live on April 17, beginning at 5:00pm EST, and lasted 11 hours and 37 minutes. The mastered version of the album was released to streaming services on April 20.

Track listing
All songs produced by Statik Selektah.

Notes
  Track 6 "Superstar" is titled as "Superstarr" on all digital platforms iTunes, Amazon, Tidal, Spotify, SoundCloud, Deezer and Google Play.

References

External links

2019 albums
Bun B albums
Collaborative albums
Statik Selektah albums
Albums produced by Statik Selektah